Nigeria Airways Flight 357 was a scheduled domestic passenger flight from Yola Airport in Yola to Murtala Muhammed International Airport in Lagos, with stops at Yakubu Gowon Airport in Jos and Kaduna International Airport in Kaduna. On 13 November 1995, the Boeing 737-2F9, during its second leg of the flight from Jos to Kaduna, suffered a runway overrun accident at Kaduna Airport, leading to a fire that destroyed the aircraft. All 14 crew members survived, while 11 of the 124 passengers died.

Background
The aircraft was a Boeing 737-2F9 registered in Nigerian registration code 5N-AUA. The aircraft was equipped with 2 Pratt & Whitney Canada engines. It was manufactured on 14 October 1982. Manufactured in Renton, U.S.A and had a construction number of 22985, it was first flown on 11 February 1983. The aircraft had the airframe time of 22,375.40 hours.

The Captain was 43 year old I. B. Dambazau with a Nigerian issued Airline Transport Pilot Licence Number 2911 valid until May 1996. He
had his command ratings on B-737, Cessna-150 and Piper Aztec. As at the time of the accident, the Commander had a total flying experience of over 6,000 hours of which over 4,000 hours were on type. The Commander was qualified to take the flight. While the First Officer was 39 year old C. A. Elom with a Nigerian issued Commercial Pilot Licence Number 2884 which was valid until midnight of 13 November 1995. His part 2 ratings were Boeing-737 and Boeing-727. The First Officer had a total flying experience of over 5,000 hours out of which 3,000 hours were on type. He was found qualified to take the flight that day.

Before the fatal Jos - Kaduna sector, the aircraft had flown from Yola to Jos. The first and third sectors of the flight were flown by the Captain, while the first officer was on the controls for the second sector (KAD -JOS) of the flight. They both had problems with the flight controls in these sectors (aircraft veering to the left or right). The aircraft landed at Yola at 21:00 UTC for a night stop and the crew arrived at their hotel by 22:00 UTC.

Accident
Flight 357 took off from Yola Airport at 07:30 UTC for Kaduna, carrying 138 people on board with an adequate fuel. The Captain stated that the
official crew members were eight in number and the extra six persons were boarded at his discretion and that of the Station Manager. The Estimated Time of Arrival at Kaduna is 07:46 UTC. Kaduna gave Flight 357 an inbound clearance for approach onto runway 05. Though, the initial landing clearance was for runway 05, the Captain requested to land on runway 23. He was reminded by the Air Traffic Controller that the wind was from 090 magnetic, but he still insisted on using the 23 approach. The Captain, therefore, accepted to land with a tailwind.

The crew then tried to align the aircraft with the runway. The First Officer asked the Captain "Can you make it to land from that position?" An observer in the cockpit also suggested going on the downwind; presumably to re-position the aircraft for landing on runway 05. However, there was no response at all from the Captain and the approach was continued for runway 23. The left turn was very steep and it took the aircraft to the left of the runway centreline and a right correction was applied. The observer had to shout a warning "Watch the wing" as the wings could have struck the ground on the final approach. The crew were still struggling with the plane's control to align it with the runway.

The Captain was reported to have used 1.8 and 1.6 EPR (Engine Power Ratio) on the reversers. When a runway overrun became inevitable, the Captain turned the aircraft to the left with the intention to take advantage of the last rapid exit intersection to avoid the runway end lights. At this juncture, the aircraft entered an uncontrollable skid. The attendant turning moments inevitably forced the right wing to hit the ground, thus rupturing the fuel tanks and a huge fire erupted. Passengers and crews scrambled and tried to escape the fiery wreckage. 66 people were injured in the crash, 14 of them seriously. 11 passengers on board were killed.

References

External links

Final report (Alternate) (Archive) Nigerian Federal Ministry of Aviation

Aviation accidents and incidents in Nigeria
Accidents and incidents involving the Boeing 737 Original
Aviation accidents and incidents in 1995
Nigeria Airways accidents and incidents
1995 in Nigeria
November 1995 events in Africa
Airliner accidents and incidents caused by pilot error
1995 disasters in Nigeria